SHK might refer to:
Schempp-Hirth SHK aerobatic glider
Speaker of the House of Keys of Isle of Man
Sun Hung Kai (disambiguation), groups of property and finance companies in Hong Kong
Swedish Accident Investigation Authority (Statens Haverikommission)
Stichodactyla toxin, a toxin from a sea anemone